The 1963–64 Botola is the 8th season of the Moroccan Premier League. FAR Rabat are the holders of the title.

References

Morocco 1963–64

Botola seasons
Morocco
Botola